Emerald is an unincorporated community in Lancaster County, Nebraska, United States.

Demographics

History
A post office was established at Emerald in 1884, and remained in operation until it was discontinued in 1943. The community was so named because its landscape was said to be as green as an emerald.

Education
A portion of Emerald is within Lincoln Public Schools. Another portion is zoned to Malcolm Public Schools.

References

Unincorporated communities in Lancaster County, Nebraska
Unincorporated communities in Nebraska